My First Time Around is the 1968 debut LP by Betty Wright. The album was recorded when Wright was 14 years old. It includes the Top 40 hit single "Girls Can't Do What the Guys Do".

Track listing

Personnel
 Betty Wright - lead vocals
 Joey Murcia – guitar
 Bobby Birdwatcher - piano, organ
 Clarence Reid - piano
 Arnold Albury - piano
 David Brown - bass
 Eddie Martinez - drums
 Butch Trucks - drums
 The Reid Singers - backing vocals

Critical reception

References

1968 debut albums
Betty Wright albums
Albums produced by Brad Shapiro
Atco Records albums